International Journal of Shoulder Surgery (ISSN: Print - 0973-6042) is peer-reviewed open access journal published on behalf of the Cape Shoulder Institute. The journal publishes articles on the subject of Orthopaedics.

The journal is indexed with African Index Medicus, Caspur, DOAJ, EBSCO Publishing’s Electronic Databases, Expanded Academic ASAP, Genamics JournalSeek, Google Scholar, Health & Wellness Research Center, Health Reference Center Academic, Hinari, Index Copernicus, OpenJGate, PubMed, Pubmed Central, SCOLOAR, SIIC databases, Ulrich’s International Periodical Directory.

There are no page charges for submissions to the journal.

External links 
 Official Website

Open access journals
Quarterly journals
English-language journals
Surgery journals
Medknow Publications academic journals